Blue Nile University (Jām'ah al-Nīl al-azraq) is a public university located in Damazeen, Sudan.
It was established in 1995.
It is a member of the Federation of the Universities of the Islamic World.

References

Universities and colleges in Sudan
Educational institutions established in 1995
1995 establishments in Sudan